Pyropteron chrysidiforme, the fiery clearwing, is a moth of the family Sesiidae. It is found in Europe, more specifically in Spain, Portugal, Majorca, southern England, Belgium, France, Corsica, Sardinia, Italy and southern Germany.

The wingspan is 15–23 mm. The moth flies from June to July depending on the location.

The larvae feed on Rumex species.

Subspecies
Pyropteron chrysidiforme chrysidiforme
Pyropteron chrysidiforme siculum Le Cerf, 1922

External links

Fiery clearwing at UKmoths
Lepiforum.de

Moths described in 1782
Sesiidae
Moths of Europe
Moths of Asia
Taxa named by Eugenius Johann Christoph Esper